For the Summer and Winter Olympics, there are 27 venues that have been or will be used for figure skating. This is one of two sports in the Winter Olympics to debut in the Summer Olympics with ice hockey being the other. The first venue for the event took place during the 1908 Games was held indoors. Twelve years later, the venue joined ice hockey as another Winter Olympic sport in the Summer Olympics. For the first two Winter Olympics, figure skating was held outdoors. With figure skating being held outdoors, there were weather concerns with thawing for the first two Winter Games. A suggestion by International Olympic Committee President Count Henri de Baillet-Latour to 1932 Olympic Organizing Committee President Godfrey Dewey in September 1930 led Dewey to create the first indoor arena for the Winter Olympics. For the 1936 Games, the venue was covered partially. Following World War II, the 1948 venue became the first venue to be used twice at the Winter Olympics since it had been used twenty years earlier. Figure skating's final competition that took place outdoors was in 1956 though that venue has since had a roof added to it. Since 1960, all figure skating competitions have taken place indoors. Three National Hockey League (NHL) venues have hosted Olympic figure skating competitions: the 1988 (both venues) and the 2010 though the NHL Vancouver Canucks moved out of the 2010 venue following the 1994–95 season. The 2002 venue was a National Basketball Association (NBA) venue which meant the Utah Jazz was on a road trip during the 2002 Games.

References

Venues
 
Figure skating
Figure skating
Olympic venues
Olympic venues